John Harkins may refer to:
 John Harkins (actor) (1932 – 1999), American actor
 John Harkins (baseball) (1859 – 1940), American baseball player
 John Harkins (footballer) (1881 – 1916), Scottish footballer
 John Harkins (musician), American Australia-based jazz pianist